was a Russian-language weekly Jewish newspaper published in Moscow in the Russian Empire from 1916 until October 1917.

See also
 History of the Jews in Russia

References

1916 establishments in the Russian Empire
1917 disestablishments in Russia
Defunct newspapers published in Russia
Publications established in 1916
Publications disestablished in 1917
Russian-language newspapers
Newspapers published in Russia